John Mackie Wren (26 April 1936 – 13 August 2020) was a Scottish footballer who played for Hibernian, Rotherham United, Stirling Albion and Berwick Rangers. He later emigrated to South Africa and played for Hellenic F.C. and Cape Town City.

References

1936 births
2020 deaths
Scottish footballers
People from Bonnybridge
Association football goalkeepers
Bo'ness United F.C. players
Hibernian F.C. players
Rotherham United F.C. players
Stirling Albion F.C. players
Berwick Rangers F.C. players
Scottish Football League players
English Football League players
Footballers from Falkirk (council area)
Scottish expatriate footballers
Expatriate soccer players in South Africa
Scottish expatriate sportspeople in South Africa
Hellenic F.C. players
Cape Town City F.C. (NFL) players
National Football League (South Africa) players